Afrixalus equatorialis, also known as the Congo banana frog, is a species of frog in the family Hyperoliidae. It is found in the central parts of the Congo Basin in the Democratic Republic of the Congo and southeastern Cameroon, and is likely to be found in the Republic of the Congo and the Central African Republic too. It might be conspecific with Afrixalus nigeriensis and is closely related to Afrixalus leucostictus.

Description
Adult males measure  and adult females  in snout–vent length. The dorsal pattern consists of an almost square dark spot. This species is quite similar to Afrixalus nigeriensis from West Africa but lacks the dark lumbar band which is almost always present in the latter species.

The male advertisement call consists of an initial sound and a small number of identical figures with a peak frequency intensity of 2000–2500 Hz, emitted at a rate of 15–20 per second.

Habitat and conservation
Afrixalus equatorialis occurs in lowland rainforest. The Cameroon record is from a swampy forest. Its breeding biology is unknown, but it presumably lays the eggs on leaves above water; the tadpoles fall into the water and develop there.

This species is unlikely to be tolerant of alteration to its habitat. While it can locally be threatened by shifting agriculture, most of its habitat remains intact. It is also present in the Salonga National Park (Democratic Republic of the Congo).

References

equatorialis
Frogs of Africa
Amphibians of Cameroon
Amphibians of the Democratic Republic of the Congo
Taxa named by Raymond Laurent
Amphibians described in 1941
Taxonomy articles created by Polbot